Stuart Abbot (born 21 June 1986) is a Scottish footballer who plays in midfield for junior side Banks O' Dee. He began his career with Dundee United, making three appearances in the Scottish Premier League (SPL) in 2006. He has also played junior football for Carnoustie Panmure and Lochee United.

Career 
Abbot, born in Dundee, began his career with Dundee United, making his senior debut in April 2006 as a late substitute in a Scottish Premier League match at Inverness Caledonian Thistle. Offered a new one-year contract shortly afterwards, Abbot made his full debut at home the following week, although his third appearance ended early due to injury. It proved to be Abbot's last appearance in senior football; he quit professional football in September to pursue full-time university studies and he was released from his United contract, subsequently joining local side Carnoustie Panmure. Abbot moved to Lochee United in July 2008. Having graduated from university, he relocated to Aberdeen. Abbot trained with junior side Banks O' Dee and after proving his fitness signed for the club.

Career statistics

See also 
 Brian O'Donnell
 Gregor Abel
 Billy Abercromby

References

External links 
 
 

1986 births
Association football defenders
Association football midfielders
Carnoustie Panmure F.C. players
Dundee United F.C. players
Living people
Lochee United F.C. players
Banks O' Dee F.C. players
Scottish footballers
Scottish Junior Football Association players
Scottish Premier League players
Footballers from Dundee
Forfar Athletic F.C. players
Scottish Football League players